Anděl is a lunar impact crater that lies in the rugged central highlands of the Moon. It was named after the Czech astronomer Karel Anděl. Nearby craters of note include Abulfeda to the south-southeast and Descartes to the east-southeast. About 85 kilometres to the east-northeast of the outer rim is the landing site of the Apollo 16 mission.

The eroded outer rim of Anděl has been worn and distorted into a polygonal shape, and is nearly non-existent to the south where Anděl G intersects the perimeter. The interior floor is nearly flat, with some irregularities to the southeast. There is a tiny craterlet located just to the southeast of the midpoint, but no central peak of any significance.

Satellite craters

By convention these features are identified on lunar maps by placing the letter on the side of the crater midpoint that is closest to Anděl.

References

External links

Anděl at The Moon Wiki
 

Impact craters on the Moon